Barbados competed at the 2015 World Championships in Athletics in Beijing, China, from 22 to 30 August 2015.

Results
(q – qualified, NM – no mark, SB – season best)

Men 
Track and road events

Women 
Track and road events

Combined events – Heptathlon

References

Nations at the 2015 World Championships in Athletics
2015
World Championships in Athletics